WCTN is a Spanish hits radio station broadcasting on 950 kHz in the medium-wave AM band from Potomac, Maryland.

History
Seven Locks Broadcasting Company obtained a construction permit for station WXLN on July 1, 1964. Seven Locks was beset by financial problems; the permit was initially applied for in 1958 but faced delays due to ownership changes, and the deadline to construct was extended ten times between 1964 and 1971. WXLN went on the air in November 1971 with an adult standards format, but was forced to suspend operations May 26, 1972 due to bankruptcy.

The station was sold to Christ Church, Washington Parish in February 1973, who put the station back on the air that May 21 with one of the first contemporary Christian music formats in the nation.

Translator
WCTN signed on FM translator W257BW (94.3 MHz) on August 30, 2017. This translator immediately drew interference complaints from listeners of co-channel WOWD-LP, licensed to Takoma Park, Maryland. Win Radio did not respond to any of the listener complaints or inquiries from the FCC. As a translator is not allowed to cause any interference to another station, its license application was dismissed on May 8, 2018, and Win Radio was ordered to immediately cease its operation.

References

External links

CTN
Radio stations established in 1971
1971 establishments in Maryland
Potomac, Maryland
Spanish-language radio stations in Maryland